Deborah Ann Woll (born February 7, 1985) is an American actress and model. Woll played Jessica Hamby in the HBO drama series True Blood (2008–2014), which earned her a nomination for a Screen Actors Guild Award. She subsequently starred as Karen Page in the Marvel series Daredevil (2015–2018), The Defenders (2017), and The Punisher (2017–2019). Her film roles include Mother's Day (2010), Seven Days in Utopia (2011), Someday This Pain Will Be Useful to You (2011), Catch .44 (2011), Ruby Sparks (2012), Meet Me in Montenegro (2014), The Automatic Hate (2015), and the commercially-successful Escape Room (2019) and its 2021 sequel. In 2022, she provided the voice and motion capture of Faye in the video game God of War: Ragnarok.

Early life
Deborah Ann Woll was born in New York City on February 7, 1985. Her father is an architect and her mother, Cathy Woll, is a teacher at the Berkeley Carroll School. She is of Irish and German descent. She attended the Packer Collegiate Institute, and received a BFA from USC School of Dramatic Arts at the University of Southern California. She also trained at the Royal Academy of Dramatic Arts (RADA) in London.

Career
Woll began her career with guest starring roles in several television series, including Life (2007), ER (2008), CSI: Crime Scene Investigation (2008), My Name Is Earl (2008), and The Mentalist (2008), and had a supporting role in the action-adventure television film Aces 'N' Eights (2008). 

In 2008, Woll landed her breakout role as Bill Compton's vampire progeny, Jessica Hamby, in the HBO fantasy drama series True Blood. She originally joined as a recurring character in the first season, but was promoted to a regular cast member for the second season onwards. In 2009, she and her True Blood co-stars won the Satellite Award for Best Cast – Television Series at the 14th annual ceremony. At the 16th Screen Actors Guild Awards which took place the year following, she and her co-stars were nominated for Outstanding Performance by an Ensemble in a Drama Series. Woll maintained the role of Jessica until the series' ending in 2014.

In 2009, she made a guest appearance in an episode of Law & Order: Special Victims Unit, portraying a young woman who is found alive after being reported missing by her boyfriend. In 2010, Woll made her feature film debut in the psychological horror Mother's Day. In 2011, she starred in the supernatural thriller Little Murder, the sports drama Seven Days in Utopia, the action film Catch .44, and the comedy-drama Someday This Pain Will Be Useful to You.

In 2012, Woll made a brief appearance in the romantic comedy-drama film Ruby Sparks. The year following, she performed at the Wallis Annenberg Center for the Performing Arts in the play Parfumerie. That same year, she joined the cast of the drama film The Automatic Hate. In 2015, she starred in the independent romantic drama film Forever. She has portrayed Karen Page in the Marvel series for Netflix, specifically as the female lead in Daredevil, and as a recurring actor in The Punisher and The Defenders. Daredevil earned her a nomination for a Saturn Award. In 2018, Woll starred in the comedy film Silver Lake. She also appeared in the action thriller film Escape Room in 2019, a role she reprised in its sequel Escape Room: Tournament of Champions (2021). The former was a major commercial success, surpassing initial expectations and debuting with $18.2 million, and finishing with $155.7 million.

Woll starred in the second season of Force Grey: Lost City of Omu (2017), a Dungeons & Dragons web series which focused on the Tomb of Annihilation storyline, and appeared as a guest player in the 45th episode of Critical Role second campaign. In 2019, she was the Dungeon Master of the Geek & Sundry show Relics and Rarities, which used a modified version of Dungeons & Dragons. In May 2019, Woll stated that Relics and Rarities had not yet been picked up for a second season and said, "I can say I have written a second season, or at least I’ve outlined it. It’s ready to be fleshed out. Whether or not we get picked up, [...][the cast] will be coming over to my house and playing it, cameras or not".

Since 2019, she has been a regular guest in seasons 7 through 10 of the web show GameNight! by BoardGameGeek. In 2022, it was announced that Woll would be the Dungeon Master for the ongoing D&D actual play show Children of Éarte. It premiered in March 2022 on the Demiplane Twitch channel.

Personal life
Woll began dating E. J. Scott in December 2007. They married in December 2018. Scott has choroideremia, a condition that ultimately results in blindness, and Woll uses her platform to help raise awareness of the disease. She has said that Scott's attitude towards his disability has inspired courage in her own, admittedly less life-changing, battle with celiac disease. 

She is an enthusiastic Dungeons & Dragons player and has been interviewed by D&D Beyond and Dragon Talk. She has appeared in several Dungeons & Dragons charity specials, as both a player and a Dungeon Master, produced by Lost Odyssey Events.

Filmography

Film

Television

Web series

Video games

Stage

Awards and nominations

See also
 List of people diagnosed with celiac disease

References

External links

 
 

1985 births
21st-century American actresses
Actresses from New York City
Models from New York City
American film actresses
American models
American people of German descent
American people of Irish descent
American television actresses
American stage actresses
Living people
People from Brooklyn
USC School of Dramatic Arts alumni